The University of Ilocos Philippines (UIP) formerly known as (Ilocos Sur Polytechnic State University or ISPSU) is a public college in the Philippines.  It was founded in 1998 by the Philippine Congress.   Its main campus is located in Santa Maria, Ilocos Sur.

UIP provides professional and technical training in the undergraduate and the graduate levels in economics, agriculture, fishery, trade, home industry, engineering, education, forest research and conservation, management, finance, accounting and business administration, public administration and other fields.

ISPSC promotes scientific and technological research.

History
On February 24, 1998, President Fidel V. Ramos signed a bill creating ISPSC.  It converted the then Ilocos Sur Agricultural College (ISAC) into a polytechnic college integrating into it the following schools

 Narvacan School of Fisheries NASOF), 
 Southern Ilocos Sur School of Fisheries (SISSOF), 
 Ilocos Sur Experimental Station and Pilot School of Cottage Industries (ISESPSCI), 
 Tagudin General Comprehensive High School (TGCHS), 
 Cervantes National Agro-Industrial School (CNAIS), 
 Suyo National High School

After its conversion into a state college, two of the campuses, Suyo and Salcedo , were reverted to the Philipine Department of Education.

Programs 
ISPSC offers two accredited graduate programs in the fields of Education and Agriculture.

ISPSC offers the following accredited undergraduate programs:

 Elementary and Secondary school Teacher Education, 
 Agriculture, 
 Home Technology Education, 
 Information Technology, 
 Industrial Technology and 
 Hotel and Restaurant Management.

Administration and President(s)
The first President of ISPSC was Dr. Alejandro V. Directo, He began his term on July 16, 1999 and was extended for a second term in 2003. Directo instituted the campus identity through the designation of a flagship program for each campus. He initiated the accreditation of degree programs offered by ISPSC .

He worked out for the development of a Medium Term Development Plan of the college (2011–2015), and instituted a new set-up for the college. The new college set-up produced two campus clusters: the North Cluster – consisting of Santa Maria, Santiago and Narvacan,  and the South Cluster – consisting of Tagudin, Candon and Cervantes. Querubin created the Office of Vice President for Planning, Research, Extension and Training. He also aggressively pushed for physical plant development.

In January 2016, the third President, Dr. Francisco D. Lopez, was inaugurated.  Lopez started projects including the New Agriculture Building, Engineering Building, Graduate School Building, Graduate School Building Annex, Training Center, Refurbishment of the College Gymnasium, College Clinic, Women’s Dormitory, New Hostel Building, beautification of the perimeter fences, The New Academic Building, widening of Access Roads and the College Grandstand and the procurement of school buses.  Lopez served until his death in 2019.

Dr. Rogelio T. Galera Jr., Director of CHED Region 1, served as the Officer-in-Charge of the College from October 2019 to July 2020.

On July 6, 2020, Dr. Gilbert R. Arce became the fourth President of ISPSC .

Campuses
The main campus for the North Cluster is the Santa Maria Campus, the Provincial Institute of Agriculture. It started as a farm school in 1913, then evolved into the Santa Maria Agricultural High School (SMAHS) . In 1963, SMAHS was converted into the Ilocos Sur Agricultural College. Then in 1995, it was converted into the Ilocos Sur Polytechnic College.

The Narvacan Campus was established as the Narvacan School of Fisheries in 19642. When it was integrated into ISPSC, the Narvacan Campus became the College of Fisheries and Marine Science. Today, it is identified as the Provincial Institute of Fisheries.

The Santiago Campus was established as the Ilocos Sur Experimental Station and Pilot School of Cottage Industries (ISESPSCI)  on June 19, 1965. It is situated on a  area along the national highway in the municipality of Santiago, Ilocos Sur. When it was integrated into ISPSC, it became the College of Engineering and Technology. At present, Santiago Campus houses the College of Technology.

Tagudin Campus is the seat of governance in the South Cluster. It was used to be the Tagudin General Comprehensive High School established which started as the Tagudin High School and became a national high school on June 19, 1965. After its integration into ISPSC, it became the College of Arts and Sciences. Today it houses the College of Teacher Education, the College of Business and Hospitality Management, the College of Arts and Sciences, and the College of Information Technology.

The Candon campus used to be the Southern Ilocos Sur School of Fisheries (SISSOF) which evolved from a fishery demonstration farm (Ilocos Sur Marine Demonstration Farm). It is located in the coastal barangay of Darapidap, Candon. With its integration into the ISPSC, it became the College of Commercial and Social Services. At present, the Candon campus houses the College of Business and Hospitality Management.

Cervantes Campus used to be the Cervantes National Agro-Industrial School (CNAIS) which evolved from the Cervantes National School of Arts and Trades established by virtue of RA 4424 signed into law on June 19, 1965. It is located in a scenic upland municipality which is also a gateway to the Cordillera provinces. When it was integrated into ISPSC, it became the College of Agro-Industrial Technology. Cervantes Campus offers teacher education, information technology and hotel and restaurant management courses.

Since the chartering of ISPSC in 1998, much had been accomplished in terms of academic and technical pursuits, facilities and plant development, research and extension services, community involvement, administration and governance, linkaging and networking, faculty and staff development, and student development. Guided by its vision as “an institution for total human development,” it continues to be a beacon of hope to the people in the service area and together thread the path towards greater heights.

References

Universities and colleges in Ilocos Sur
State universities and colleges in the Philippines
Philippine Association of State Universities and Colleges